The 2018 Maharlika Pilipinas Basketball League (MPBL) Rajah Cup Finals is the best-of-5 championship series of the 2018 MPBL Rajah Cup and the conclusion of the conference's playoffs. The Batangas City Athletics and the Muntinlupa Cagers competed for the inaugural Rajah Cup championship and also the very first championship contested by the league. In four games, league founder, Sen. Manny Pacquiao, gave one million pesos (₱1,000,000) to the Batangas City Athletics as they were crowned as the inaugural MPBL Finals Champions with an 18-karat gold trophy, while five hundred thousand pesos (₱500,000) was given  to the Muntinlupa Cagers as the losing finalist.

Background

Road to the finals

Head-to-head matchup

Series summary

Game summaries

Game 1 

Tey Teodoro made 20 points to pave the way for the Batangas City Athletics to claim the finals opener, as Val Acuna also added 14 points to help the team in the win. With the game tied at 64-all, Teodoro hit a free throw before scoring on a jump shot with 25 seconds left in the fourth period to give the Athletics a three-point lead. As the Cagers were unable to convert a basket, Teodoro managed to draw a foul from an Athletic and split his two charities given, which gave them a four-point lead in the final 14 seconds. And from there on, they were able to seal the victory and draw the first blood in the title series.

Game 2 

Jaymo Eguilos of the Athletics scored a jumper to extend their lead to 9, 74–65, with the final 1:14 left on the clock. After that shot, the Cagers went on to storm a 9-2 scoring run to cut the deficit to 2 points, 76–74, going in to the final 17 seconds. With Batangas holding to their tight defense, Teytey Teodoro was able to draw a foul on Chito Jaime, resulting to two charities being made as they hold on to their four-point victory, extending the series lead to 2–0 and one more win gives them the inaugural league championship and the possible first-ever finals sweep in the history of the league.

Game 3 

This game marked the first loss of the Athletics since losing to the Bulacan Kuyas in the elimination round last March 3, also marks the team's first loss of the playoffs. In the fourth quarter, Batangas scared Muntinlupa with an 11-5 scoring run after being down by 15 points, 64–49, in the 1:04 mark of third quarter, with this run, the deficit was cut down to 9, 69–60, in the 6:38 mark of fourth quarter. But as Athletics not giving up to the fight, they would eventually cut down further the Cagers lead as close as 2, 79–77, in the final 49 seconds of the game. Dave Moralde had an answer to stop the bleeding, to reextend the lead to 4 with a one-hand jumper. As they were able to hold to their defense, they would eventually spoil the possible championship celebration and extend the series to a Game 4.

Game 4 

The Muntinlupa Cagers entered the match facing a do-or-die situation, with a 1–2 series deficit. In the early minutes of the fourth period, the Athletics led by 9 points, 57–48. However, a 10-0 run was blasted by the Cagers to regain the lead, 58–57, which all of the 10 points in the run came from Pari Llagas. Then the succeeding minutes, it was a seesaw battle where no team led more than 4 points. In the final 3.6 seconds of the game, Muntinlupa had a chance to send the game to an overtime coming off a foul from Mark Olayon. However, Llagas missed both charities that sealed the victory and the first MPBL Championship for the Batangas City Athletics.

Broadcast notes 
The Rajah Cup Finals were aired on ABS-CBN's sports channel, ABS-CBN Sports and Action. The league aired its S+A broadcasts online via livestreaming through Facebook Live on the official MPBL page.

 Additional Game 4 crew:
 Trophy presentation and Awarding Ceremonies: Kyla Realubit
 Dugout celebration interviewer:

References

External links 
 MPBL Official Website

Maharlika Pilipinas Basketball League
2018 in Philippine sport